Fred Schwarzbach is an American academic. He is a professor of Victorian literature at New York University, and the former dean of NYU Liberal Studies.

Selected works

References

Living people
Columbia University alumni
Alumni of University College London
New York University faculty
American university and college faculty deans
Year of birth missing (living people)